The Topographic Atlas of Switzerland (German: Topographischer Atlas der Schweiz), also known as the Siegfried Atlas or Siegfried Map (German: Siegfriedkarte; French: Carte Siegfried) is an official map series of Switzerland.  Its publication was begun by the Federal Topographic Bureau under Hermann Siegfried, and continued from 1870 to 1926. During this period the individual maps were drawn by different lithographers, including Walter Hauenstein, Georg Christian von Hoven and Rudolf Leuzinger. Since it is, in today's parlance, not strictly an atlas but a map series, map historians now describe it only by the expression Siegfried Map.

The Siegfried Map was based on the original records that had already been created for the earlier Dufour Map. However, the Siegfried Map offered greater precision than the Dufour Map, by using a scale of 1:25,000 for the Swiss plateau, the French Prealps, the Jura Mountains and southern Ticino, and a scale of 1:50,000 for other mountain regions and the Swiss Alps.

The area covered by the former scale was initially divided into 462 pages, and the other area into 142 pages, with the two areas overlapping in places.  A format of  x  for each page was common to both scales.

In addition, three colors were used directly for printing, whereas the Dufour Map was initially monochrome. On the Siegfried Map, the colours used were brown for the contour lines on vegetated terrain, blue for water and contour lines on glaciers, and black for the rest.

The Siegfried Map projection was a cone equivalent, as for the Dufour Map.

The print mode used for the 1:25,000 pages was initially intaglio, and from 1905 a printing plate.  The 1:50,000 pages were printed via a lithography process, and from 1910 by intaglio.

Until 1949, there were occasional revised editions of Siegfried Map pages.  From 1952, the Siegfried and Dufour Maps were replaced by the new National Map of Switzerland.

External links
 Siegfried Map in the map collection of the Swiss Federal Office of Topography
 Images of all first editions and later editions of the Siegfried Map
 Online access to www.geo.admin.ch

Citations 

Map series
Map series of Switzerland
Atlases